Piermaria is a masculine Italian given name. Notable people with the name include:

Piermaria Bagnadore (c. 1550–1627), Italian painter and architect
Piermaria Porettano, Italian Baroque painter
Piermaria Oddone (born 1944), American physicist
Piermaria Siciliano (born 1974), Italian swimmer

Italian masculine given names